Michel Lejeune may refer to:
Michel Lejeune (linguist) (1907–2000), French specialist in Ancient Greek
Michel Lejeune (politician) (1946–2021), member of the National Assembly of France

See also
Lejeune, a surname, with a list of people so named